Hapoel Bnei Hurfeish is an Israeli football club based in the Hurfeish. The club currently plays in Liga Gimel Upper Galilee division.

History
The club was established in 2013 as a revival of a defunct club, Hapoel Hurfeish, which operated until 2003, and in its best played in Liga Alef. The new club was placed in the Upper Galilee division of Liga Gimel, and finished 11th in its first season in the league, and 6th in its second season. In the cup, the club's best achievement is the fourth round, which doubles as the league cup final, where they lost in 2014–15 to Maccabi Nahf 1–5.

Home ground
The club plays his home matches in the nearby village of Peki'in, as the old football stadium in the village, which was built in 1978, deemed unfit.  Work on the renovation of the stadium began in 2013, but work was halted in early 2014 as the budget ran out, due to inadequate planning.

References

External links
Hapoel Bnei Hurfeish  Israel Football Association 
Horfesh.net (Sport section) 
Hapoel Bnei Hurfeish Facebook 

Hurfeish
Hurfeish
Association football clubs established in 2013